Comunitarian Party Option Seven (in Spanish: Partido Comunitario Opción Siete) is a political party in Colombia. PCOS is led by Venus Albeiro Silva Gómez, the sole party representative in the Congress of Colombia. PCOS was recognized as a political party National Electoral Council in September 2002, but later lost its status as a juridical person.

PCOS is a part of the Democratic Alternative coalition.

PCOS held its 8th National Convention in Bogotá, October 2004.

Political parties in Colombia